Mangelia perforata is an extinct species of sea snail, a marine gastropod mollusk in the family Mangeliidae.

Description
The length of the shell attains 6.8 mm, its diameter 2.8 mm.

Distribution
This extinct marine species was found in the Middle Miocene strata in Poland and from Kostej in Transylvania.

References

 Bellardi 1877. I molluschi dei terreni terziarii del Piemonte e della Liguria, Parte I, pp. 1–245, parte II, pp. 1–364. Torino. 
 Böttger, O. 1896, 1901, 1906, 1907. Zur Kentnis der Fauna der mittelmiocänen Schichten von Kostej im Krassó-Szörenyer Komitat. Verhandlungen und Mitteilungen des siebenbürgischen Vereins für aturwissenschaften zu Hermannstadt, 46, 49-66; 51, 1-199; 54, 1-99; 55, 101-217.
 Brusina, S. 1877. Fragmenta Vindobonesia. Journal de Conchyliologie, ser. 3, 17, 368-391.
 Bałuk, Wacław. "Middle Miocene (Badenian) Gastropods from Korytnica, Poland; Part IV–Turridae." Acta Geologica Polonica 53.1 (2003): 29-78.

External links

perforata
Gastropods described in 1877